Safiye Simay Karaman (born 11 March 1991) is a Turkish professional basketball player. She was a member of the Turkey women's national basketball team.

Private life
Safiye Simay Karaman was born in Bakırköy district of Istanbul Province, Turkey on 11 March 1991.

On 5 June 2017, she got engaged with Göksenin Köksal, captain of the Galatasaray men's basketball team. After eight years of togetherness, the couple married on 7 July 2018. On 26 March 2020, she gave birth to a son named Ayaz.

Sport career

Club
Karaman began basketball playing in Galatasaray at age pf seven. She then played in youth, juniors and women's teams of the  İstanbul Üniversitesi SK. Between 2011 and 2013, she played three seasons for Orduspor in the Turkish Women's Basketball Second League (TKB2L), and capped 81 times. She was coached by Alper Durur for more than ten years. In the 2014–15 season, she played for the Turkish Women's Basketball League's (TKBL) new taem "Basketbolu Geliştirme Derneği" (BGD. She started the 2015-16 Women's Basketball Super League (TKBSL) season with the BGD team, transferred, however, by late November 2015 to the  Yakın Doğu Üniversitesi of Northern Cyprus team, which play in the Turkish League. In the 2016–17 season, she played for the also in Turkey competing Northern Cyprus basketball team of Girne American University.

International
Simay was admitted to the Turkey women's national under-16 and under-17 basketball team, and took part at the 
2007 FIBA Europe Under-16 Championship for Women in Valmiera, Latvia.

She was called up to the Turkey women's national basketball team, and played preparation matches for the EuroBasket Women 2017. She did not take part at the championship.

As of 2017, she wore the Turkey national team's jersey 85 times.

References

1991 births
Living people
People from Bakırköy
Basketball players from Istanbul
Turkish women's basketball players
Forwards (basketball)
Galatasaray S.K. (women's basketball) players